"All Together Now" is a song by British band the Farm, released in November 1990 as the second single from their debut album, Spartacus (1991). Peter Hooton wrote the lyrics in his early 20s, after reading about the Christmas truce of 1914.  The song was first recorded under the title "No Man's Land" for a John Peel session in 1983. In 1990, Hooton wrote the chorus after Steve Grimes suggested putting the lyrics of "No Man's Land" to the chord progression of Pachelbel's Canon. To shorten the song for radio, the producer Suggs cut the song to three verses from its original six. Its accompanying music video received heavy rotation on MTV Europe. "All Together Now" has been used by numerous football teams since, as well as by the Labour Party for their 2017 general election campaign, often played during rallies.

Composition and release
The song was produced by Suggs, a founding member of the band Madness, and recorded at Mayfair Studios. The lyrics were written about the Christmas Day Truce in World War I where, on Christmas Day 1914, soldiers from both sides put their weapons down, and met in no mans land to exchange gifts and play football. The song has a chord sequence taken directly from Johann Pachelbel's "Canon".

It was originally released on 26 November 1990 peaking at No. 4 on the UK Singles Chart, No. 1 on the NME Independent chart and No. 7 on the U.S. Billboard Modern Rock Tracks chart. Its single cover showed a Subbuteo figure wearing an army uniform and brandishing a Bren machine gun. It was also the last video shown on The Power Station on 8 April 1991.

Critical reception
Stephen Thomas Erlewine from AllMusic called "All Together Now" "goofily endearing" and "truly memorable". Larry Flick from American magazine Billboard declared it as "anthemic". A reviewer from Daily Mirror named it one of 1990's "most memorable songs" and "such a catchy song". Jon Wilde from Melody Maker wrote, "1990 has seen the inexplicable rise of The Ordinary Bloke. They don't come any more ordinary than the Farm, who look for all the world like a collection of bit actors in Northern soap operas, the kind of geezers you find hanging about by the pub dart-board scoffing salt and vinegar crisps as burly Betty Turpin types fetch hither mixers from the cellar. Their 15 seconds of minor celebrity will surely be up once the general public get wind of this ruthlessly awful rock dirge with dancefloor pretensions." David Quantick from NME commented, "Sometimes the Farm seem to be more anonymous than the person underneath the Jive Bunny mask. [...] And now they return with a record that has a powerfully singable chorus, a pounding beat, Shaun Ryder's vocal dad Pete Wylie on backing singing...and I'm beggered if I can remember it for more than a nanosecond after it's over. A chorus without a verse, an anthem without a purpose, an answer without a question."

Promotion
In March 1994, it was performed by the band and a host of Liverpudlians in front of the Spion Kop at Anfield before the last ever Merseyside derby in front of the old Kop, which was demolished later that year and replaced by an all-seater stand. In 2007 it was used in Scottish television adverts for Clydesdale Bank and in UK-wide advertisements promoting Cancer Research UK's Race for Life. It is also used as the theme tune for Sky Sports Football League coverage and as the ending theme of the 1994 movie Double Dragon.

Track listing

 UK 7" single (1990)
 "All Together Now" (7" version) –  3:59
 "All Together Now" (Terry Farley/Peter Heller Mix edit) –  3:45

 UK 12"/CD single (1990)
 "All Together Now" –  5:45
 "All Together Now" (Terry Farley/Peter Heller Mix) –  7:21
 "All Together Now" (Rocky/Diesel Mix) –  5:13

 US CD single (1990)
 "All Together Now" (Single Mix) –  4:25
 "All Together Now" (12" Mix) –  5:42
 "All Together Now" (Indie Rock Mix) –  6:22
 "All Together Now" (Farley/Heller 12" Remix) –  7:21
 "Over Again" (Live Demo) –  4:16
 "All Together Now" (Club Mix) –  6:13
 "All Together Now" (Rocky & Diesel Mix) –  5:18
 "All Together Now" (Dream Remix) –  9:27

 UK CD single (2004)
 "All Together Now" (DJ Spoony radio edit)
 "All Together Now" (The Choral Mix)
 "All Together Now" (Spoony Wants to Move Mix)
 "The Wembley Experience" (Virtual Tour of the New Stadium)

Charts

1990 version

2004 version

Everton F.C. version
In May 1995, the song was released by Everton F.C. on occasion of its appearance in the 1995 FA Cup Final. The hit credited to "Everton FA Cup Squad 1995" peaked at No. 24 in the UK Singles chart. The release also contained a second version as "All Together Now –  D.i.y Mix".

Euro 2004 version
The song was released in another football context this time to promote the campaign of the England national football team during Euro 2004 which took place in Portugal in June and July 2004. Titled "Euro 2004 (All Together Now)", it was edited by DJ Spoony and featured additional vocals by the St Francis Xavier Boys Choir of Liverpool. This version, released on 31 May 2004, peaked at No. 5 in the UK Singles Chart.

The song was also remixed by Scouse producers BCD Project (Lee Butler of Radio City, Les Calvert and Mike Di Scala). The remix was featured on the Clubland 5 compilation in 2004.

This version was also included in the compilation Sports Themes subtitled "20 Classic Sport Themes" in July 2004.

Atomic Kitten version

In 2006, Liz McClarnon, Natasha Hamilton, and Jenny Frost from English girl band Atomic Kitten reunited to record a cover version of the song, re-titled "All Together Now (Strong Together)", for the Goleo VI Presents His 2006 FIFA World Cup Hits album, a collection of collaborations´that were released in connection with the 2006 FIFA World Cup, held from 9 June to 9 July 2006 in Germany. As with most songs on the album, FIFA mascot Goleo VI is also credited as an artist on "All Together Now". The remake features slightly re-written lyrics by Nicole Tyler, Wolfgang Boss, and Reinhard Raith, while production was overseen by Raith along with Andreas Litterscheid.

Chart performance
"All Together Now (Strong Together)" was only released in German-speaking Europe. It debuted and peaked at number 16 in Germany and spent nine weeks on the German Singles Chart, becoming Atomic Kitten's fifth highest-charting single over there as well as their highest-charting since "If You Come to Me" (2003). Elsewhere, the song peaked at number 35 in Austria, also reaching number 42 in Switzerland.

Music video
The computer animated music video shows the World Cup mascots Goleo and Pille travelling around the world until they eventually arrive to Berlin's Olympic Stadium, the setting of the 2006 FIFA World Cup Final.

Track listings

Notes
 denotes additional producer

Charts

Peace Collective version
On the 100th anniversary of the Christmas Day Truce, during World War One, which inspired the Farm's 1990 hit "All Together Now", many of the UK's biggest music stars united as the Peace Collective, to re-record the song for charity. The new track featured a backing choir of schoolboy footballers from the Premier League and German Bundesliga. All profits from the release, on 15 December, went to the British Red Cross and the Shorncliffe Trust.

Produced and recorded by Simon Britton and Jon Moon at Sensible Music in Islington (London), the 2014 version included Gorgon City, Clean Bandit, Gabrielle, Alexandra Burke, Engelbert Humperdinck, Julian Lennon, David Gray, Guy Chambers, Amelle Berrabah, Alison Levi, Mick Jones (the Clash), The Voice 2014 winner Jermain Jackman, Massive Attack's Shara Nelson and more. The 2014 version reached number one on the UK Independent Singles Breakers Chart on 19 December and number 70 on the UK Singles Chart.

See also
 List of anti-war songs

References

1983 songs
1990 singles
1995 singles
2004 singles
2006 singles
2014 singles
England national football team songs
The Farm (British band) songs
Anti-war songs
Songs written by Peter Hooton
Songs written by Steve Grimes
Football songs and chants
Sire Records singles
Reprise Records singles
Jive Records singles
Ministry of Sound singles
England at the 2006 FIFA World Cup
Christmas truce
Songs about World War I
Songs about Belgium
Popular songs based on classical music